Frank Armington (1876–1941) was a Canadian-born and raised artist who lived most of his adult life in France.

Biography

Frank Armington was born in Fordwich, Ontario on July 28, 1876.  Armington studied art in Ontario from 1892 until 1899. He also met his future wife, Caroline Wilkinson, during these studies. In 1899, Armington made his first visit to Paris. While in Paris he married Caroline Wilkinson and continued to study art, this time at the Académie Julian. Armington and his wife moved back to Canada in 1900, where Armington became a founding member and vice president of the Manitoba Society of Artists.
  
Armington returned to Paris and lived there from 1905 until 1939. While living in Paris, Frank and Caroline Armington became close friends with the poet and writer Robert W. Service who invited them to his wedding and to his Lancieux's house where they have painted. Toward the end of his life he and his wife moved to New York City.  Caroline died soon after the move, however, and Armington remarried in 1940.

Armington died in New York City in 1941. Throughout his career, Armington worked in a number of mediums including etching 221 prints and a number of lithographs.

Bibliography 
  A listing of 55 etchings (out of 221 printed by the artist) and 14 lithographs drawn from the Peel Art Gallery Museum + Archives collection. The standard monograph and catalogue, with thorough descriptions of hundreds of prints. Note - this is not a complete catalogue as it only lists the prints in the collection of the Peel Art Gallery at the time of publication.

Notes

External links 

 www.artistarchive.com   A catalogue of over 220 prints, many with images.

1876 births
1941 deaths
Canadian etchers
20th-century Canadian painters
Canadian male painters
20th-century Canadian printmakers
Canadian emigrants to France
20th-century Canadian male artists